Events from the year 1651 in Sweden

Incumbents
 Monarch – Christina

Events

 Queen Christina declare her wish to abdicate in favor of her cousin, but is convinced not to.
 National Board of Trade (Sweden)
 National law of hotels states that all hotels must have at least three bedrooms except the one of the proprietor.
 The Queen's favorite Magnus Gabriel De la Gardie loses favor with the monarch.

Births

 Carl Gustav Rehnskiöld, field marshal   (died 1722)

Deaths

 7 April - Lennart Torstensson, field marshal (born 1603) 
 Arnold Johan Messenius, historian  (born 1607)

References

 
Years of the 17th century in Sweden
Sweden